Metriotes is  a genus of moth, belonging to the family Coleophoridae.

Species
Metriotes jaeckhi Baldizzone, 1985
Metriotes lutarea (Haworth, 1828)

References

Coleophoridae